The Ganatantrik Party (Democratic Party) was a Bangladeshi political party formed in 1980 by the veteran communist leader Haji Mohammad Danesh, a leader of the Tebhaga movement. Shortly before Danesh's death in 1986, the party merged into the ruling Jatiya Party of the then-Bangladeshi President Gen. Hussain Muhammad Ershad.

References

Political parties established in 1980
Defunct political parties in Bangladesh
Communist parties in Bangladesh
1980 establishments in Bangladesh
Political parties disestablished in 1986
1986 disestablishments in Bangladesh